Romania competed at the 2019 World Aquatics Championships in Gwangju, South Korea from 12 to 28 July.

Diving

Romania entered four divers.

Men

Women

High diving

Romania qualified two male high divers.

Swimming

Romania entered four swimmers.

Men

Women

References

World Aquatics Championships
Nations at the 2019 World Aquatics Championships
2019